Pocket wilderness is a name used by Bowater corporation and the State of Tennessee for any of several tracts of Bowater-owned private land on and near the Cumberland Plateau that the company set aside beginning in 1970 "for preservation in its natural state, with no logging or development other than hiking trails permitted within its boundaries" and registered as Tennessee state natural areas. Several areas formerly managed as Bowater pocket wilderness are now incorporated into state-owned natural areas or National Park Service sites.

The Virgin Falls State Natural Area in White County was the first pocket wilderness established, originally consisting of  along the Caney Fork and including Virgin Falls. This area was acquired by the state in 1996 and is now part of a  state natural area.

Other Tennessee natural areas established as Bowater pocket wildernesses include: 
Bacon Ridge in Roane County
Honey Creek State Natural Area in Scott County,  within the boundaries of the Big South Fork National River and Recreation Area. 
Piney Falls State Natural Area in Rhea County on the east side of the Sequatchie Valley, a  area including two waterfalls 

See also
Wilderness

References

Nature reserves in Tennessee